James Monie (born 18 November 1982) is an Australian footballer who plays for Avoca.

Career
He previously played for the Australian A-League club Newcastle United Jets.

Honours
2002/2003: NSW Premier League Golden Boot Winner

References

1982 births
Living people
People from Coffs Harbour
Australian soccer players
Expatriate footballers in Malaysia
A-League Men players
Newcastle Jets FC players
Bankstown City FC players
Central Coast Mariners Academy players
National Premier Leagues players
Association football forwards
Sportsmen from New South Wales
Soccer players from New South Wales